is a Japanese original video animation produced by AIC. Directed by Kazuhiro Ochi, the OVA was released in 1987. The OVA is a one-shot tribute to the Metal Hero genre of live-action superhero shows that were prevalent in the 80s and 90s, specifically to the Space Sheriff trilogy of Gavan, Sharivan and Shaider.

The one-shot deals with dark subject matters such as bullying and teen suicide.

Plot 
Hikaru Shihoudo is Hikaruon, a metal-clad super hero fighting the forces of the evil organization known as Uraer. Disguised as a transfer student, he must investigate a series of strange suicides in town.

Characters
: Mika Doi
: Toshihiko Seki
: Kazuyuki Sogabe
: Miina Tominaga
: Shōzō Iizuka
: Tesshō Genda

Production
The theme of the OVA is "Rekkuu! Gakuen Tokusou Hikaruon ~Theme Of Hikaruon~" by Kumi Kaneko and Akira Kushida.

References

External links
 

1987 anime OVAs
Action anime and manga
Adventure anime and manga
Anime International Company
Shōnen manga